Hapalops is an extinct genus of ground sloth from the Early to Late Miocene of Brazil (Solimões Formation), Bolivia (Honda Group), Colombia (Honda Group), and Argentina (Santa Cruz Formation) in South America.

History 
Hapalops was first described by notable Argentine paleontologist and zoologist Florentino Ameghino in 1887, with his description of H. rectangularis as the type species. It was erected based on the posterior part of a left dentary that had been collected from the Miocene aged deposits of Santa Cruz, Argentina, though Ameghino also described a second partial mandible from the same deposits as part of the species, making it a paratype. All of these of these fossils have been lost and their fragmentary status puts the validity of the genus as a whole in jeopardy.

Description 
Sloths in this genus had a long, robust body with more than 19 thoracic vertebrae, a short skull, and long limbs with large, curved claws. On the ground, they probably walked on the knuckles of the forelimbs, like a gorilla. Hapalops had very few teeth with no incisors; the mandible included only four pairs of teeth.

Paleobiology 
In the Santa Cruz, Hapalops fed on vegetation in intertropical wooded savannahs. It shared its environment with both herbivorous and predatory marsupials, sheep-sized glyptodonts, armadillos, anteaters, toxodonts, typotheres, and litopterns, as well as modern reptiles such as iguanas and birds such as rheas, geese, and hawks. Giant phorusrachid "terror birds" lived in the region and may have been the top predators. Like most extinct sloths it is categorized as a ground sloth, but it is believed that the smaller size of Hapalops allowed it to engage in some climbing behaviors.

Classification 
The genus is classified within the Megatherioidea, which includes the megalonychid and the nothrotheriid sloths. While it is generally represented as an outgroup to Nothrotheriidae and a genus of uncertain relationships, it shows most of the character states that diagnose Nothrotheriidae and may be a close relative. At least 26 species in this genus have been named from the same Santa Cruz formation, a biological impossibility largely based on assigning new species names to fossil fragments. The genus awaits revision.

References

Bibliography 
 

Prehistoric sloths
Prehistoric placental genera
Miocene xenarthrans
Miocene mammals of South America
Huayquerian
Chasicoan
Mayoan
Laventan
Colloncuran
Friasian
Santacrucian
Neogene Argentina
Fossils of Argentina
Neogene Bolivia
Fossils of Bolivia
Neogene Brazil
Fossils of Brazil
Neogene Colombia
Fossils of Colombia
Honda Group, Colombia
Fossil taxa described in 1887
Taxa named by Florentino Ameghino